Simbirsk Governorate (Simbirskaya guberniya) was an administrative division (a guberniya) of the Russian Empire and the Russian SFSR, which existed from 1796 to 1928. Its administrative center was in the city of Simbirsk, renamed Ulyanovsk in 1924 (likewise, Simbirsk Governorate was named Ulyanovsk Governorate).

History

Ulyanovsk Governorate (1924–1928) 
By a decree of the Central Executive Committee of the Soviet Union of May 9, 1924, the city of Simbirsk has renamed Ulyanovsk, which included the volost, the uyezd, and the governorate itself.

In 1925, the Alatyrsky uezd was transferred to the Chuvash ASSR and 4 uezds remained in the Ulyanovsk Governorate: Ardatovsk, Karsunsk, Syzransk, and Ulyanovsk.

On January 6, 1926, by the decision of the Samara Governorate Executive Committee, the Melekessky uyezd was transferred to the Ulyanovsk governorate.

On May 14, 1928, during the economic zoning of the USSR, the governorate was abolished, and its territory became part of the Ulyanovsk Okrug, the Mordovsk Okrug, and the Syzran Okrug of the Middle Volga Oblast.

Subdivisions
Alatyrsky Uyezd
Ardatovsky Uyezd
Buinsky Uyezd
Karsunsky Uyezd
Kurmyshsky Uyezd
Sengileyevsky Uyezd
Simbirsky Uyezd
Syzransky Uyezd

References

 
1796 establishments in the Russian Empire
1928 disestablishments in Russia
States and territories established in 1796
States and territories disestablished in 1928